Breighton Aerodrome is a private aerodrome primarily used for general aviation flying located on the former Royal Air Force Breighton or more simply RAF Breighton, a former Royal Air Force station located near to the village of Breighton, East Riding of Yorkshire, England.

History
The airfield was built between 1940 and 1942 for No. 1 Group RAF, its first residents were the No. 460 Squadron RAAF.

From 1959 to 1963, as part of Project Emily, the base was a launch site for three nuclear-armed PGM-17 Thor intermediate-range ballistic missiles, operated by No. 240 Squadron RAF.

The base closed in March 1964, when the last active unit (which operated the Bristol Bloodhound air-defence missile) withdrew.

Squadrons

Units
 No. 20 Blind Approach Training Flight RAF (October 1941) became No. 1520 (Beam Approach Training) Flight RAF (October 1941 - June 1944)
 Sub site for No. 35 Maintenance Unit RAF (November 1945 - June 1951)
 Relief Landing Ground for No. 103 Flying Refresher School RAF (June - November 1951)
 Relief Landing Ground for No. 207 Advanced Flying School RAF (November 1951 - June 1954)
 No. 460 Conversion Flight RAF (May - August 1942 & September - October 1942) became 'A' Flight of No. 1656 Heavy Conversion Unit RAF (October - November 1942)
 No. 2716 Squadron RAF Regiment
 No. 2797 Squadron RAF Regiment

Current use

The original runways are covered in buildings but the outline of the runways, taxiways and dispersal stands are clearly visible using satellite imagery.

A part of the airfield is currently used by the Real Aeroplane Company to house and maintain private and historic aircraft and a home for the Breighton Flying Club which uses a separate grass runway located within the original airfield grounds.

Five people were injured in a helicopter crash at the airfield on 17 July 2016.

References

Citations

Bibliography

External links

 Real Aeroplane Company

Royal Air Force stations in Yorkshire
Royal Air Force stations of World War II in the United Kingdom